Leucine-rich PPR motif-containing protein, mitochondrial is a protein that in humans is encoded by the LRPPRC gene. Transcripts ranging in size from 4.8 to 7.0 kb which result from alternative polyadenylation have been reported for this gene.

Function
This gene encodes a protein that is leucine-rich and is thought to play a role in regulating the interaction of the cytoskeleton with a variety of cellular processes.

Clinical significance
An integrative genomics strategy led to the discovery that mutations in LRPPRC cause the French-Canadian variant of Leigh syndrome.  Furthermore, mutation in the LRPPRC gene causes lowered expression of MT-CO1 (cytochrome c oxidase I) and MT-CO3.

References

Further reading

External links